

Final table

Promoted

External links
Football Association of Slovenia 

Slovenian Republic Football League seasons
Yugo
3
Football
Football